Clepsis smicrotes is a species of moth of the family Tortricidae. It is found in Guerrero, Mexico.

The wingspan is about 15 mm. The forewings are yellowish-brown, spotted with shining leaden grey metallic scales. The hindwings are tawny grey.

References

Moths described in 1914
Clepsis